Elmville is an unincorporated community in Highland County, in the U.S. state of Ohio.

History
A post office called Elmville was established in 1855, and remained in operation until 1905. The community most likely was named for a nearby grove of elm trees.

References

Unincorporated communities in Highland County, Ohio
Unincorporated communities in Ohio